This is a list of the first-level administrative divisions of the People's Republic of China (PRC), including all provinces, autonomous regions and municipalities, in order of their total disposable income per capita in 2014. The figures are given in Renminbi. Hong Kong SAR, and Macau SAR are excluded.

Disposable income is total personal income minus personal current taxes. In national accounts definitions, personal income, minus personal current taxes equals disposable personal income. Subtracting personal outlays (which includes the major category of personal (or, private) consumption expenditure) yields personal (or, private) savings.

In 2014, the average exchange rate between RMB (CNY) and USD is 6.1428 : 1.

External links
 National Bureau of Statistics

Ranked lists of Chinese administrative divisions
China, disposable income per capita